This World's For Everyone is the fourth studio album by English pop band The Korgis. It was released in The Netherlands, Spain and Japan in 1992 and in Germany in 1993.

The album includes the 1990 charity single version of "Everybody's Got To Learn Sometime" (originally from Dumb Waiters, 1980) recorded for the International Hostage Release Foundation, single "One Life"  as well as a new rendition of  "All The Love In The World" (from Sticky George, 1981).

The German 1993 re-release of the album adds the DNA dance remix of "Everybody's Gotta Learn Sometime" as a bonus track.

The album was re-released in 2008 by Angel Air Records with five bonus tracks.

Critical reception

Jo-Ann Greene of AllMusic described the Korgis as a "sophisticated pop group" who "reached new aural heights of lushness" with This World's for Everyone. She noted that "strong melodies and catchy choruses reign supreme, with every song emphasizing the band's exquisite vocals and ferocious musical talent".

Track listing
"This World's for Everyone" (James Warren/Andy Davis) - 3:26
"Hold on" (Andy Davis) - 4:08
German edition: remix - 4:36
"Work Together" (Andy Davis/James Warren) - 3:42
"Hunger" (re-recording) (Andy Davis/Pete Brandt) - 4:49
"Show Me" (Helen Turner/Debbie Clarkson/Andy Davis) - 3:43
"Who Are These Tears for Anyway" (James Warren) - 4:14
"One Life" (James Warren/Andy Davis) - 3:35
"Love Turned Me Around" (Helen Turner/Debbie Clarkson/Andy Davis) - 5:00
"Wreckage of a Broken Heart" (Andy Davis/James Warren) - 3:12
"All the Love in the World" (1992 re-recording) (Andy Davis/James Warren) - 3:15
"Third Time Around" (Andy Davis/Kim Beacon) - 3:49
"Everybody's Got To Learn Sometime" (1990 re-recording) - 4:09

Bonus track German 1993 edition
<LI>"Everybody's Got To Learn Sometime"  (DNA House Mix 7") - 3:51

Bonus tracks 2008 re-release
<LI>"This World’s for Everyone" (Demo) 
<LI>"Hold On" (Alternative mix)
<LI>"All The Love In The World" (Alternative recording)
<LI>"The Way I Feel" (Previously unreleased) 
<LI>"Mount Everest Sings the Blues" (Live)

Personnel
 Andy Davis - keyboards, guitars, backing vocals, drum programming, chorus choir "This World's For Everyone" and "One Life"
 John Baker - vocals, guitars, keyboards, chorus choir "This World's For Everyone" and "One Life"
 James Warren - vocals, guitars, bass guitar, chorus choir "This World's For Everyone" and "One Life"

Additional personnel
 David Lord - additional keyboards
 Dave Goodier - bass guitar on "One Life"
 Helen Turner - piano on "Love Turned Me Around", chorus choir "This World's For Everyone" and "One Life"
 Sam Howard - backing vocals on "Love Turned Me Around", chorus choir "This World's For Everyone" and "One Life"
 John Griffiths - backing vocals on "Work Together", chorus choir "This World's For Everyone" and "One Life"
 Stuart Gordon - violin solo on "Everybody's Gotta Learn Sometime"
 Debbie Clarkson - chorus choir "This World's For Everyone" and "One Life"

Production
 The Korgis - producers
 Andy Davis - arranger
 David Lord - compilation, mastering
 Bob Whitfield - photography
 Tim Odam, TJO Design - design
 Recorded at Ha'penny Bridge Studios, Bath, England and Terra Incognita, Bath, England.

Single releases
Format CD unless otherwise noted.
 "Everybody's Gotta Learn Sometime" (1990 re-recording) - 4:09 / "Everybody's Got To Learn Sometime" (Instrumental) - 4:09 / "This World's for Everyone" (Home demo version) - 3:07 (International Hostage FM 12 VHF 65, 1990)
 "One Life" - 3:36 / "Wreckage of a Broken Heart" - 3:12 / "No Love in the World" (non-album track) (Andy Davis/Pete Byrne) - 3:39  (Dureco 1104272, 1992)
 The Korgis, DNA vs. N-R-G: "Everybody's Gotta Learn Sometime - 1993 Remixes"  (Slow & Moody 7") - 3:43 / (Slow & Moody 12") - 5:24 / (12" Disco Heaven Mix) - 6:47 /(Housey 7") - 3:51 (Euro Records EURY3CD UK & Eurostar 39811025 Germany, 1993)
 "Everybody's Got To Learn Sometime" (DNA Disco Heaven Mix) / "Everybody's Got To Learn Sometime"  (DNA Slow + Moody Mix) (12", Euro Records EURY 3X, UK 1993)
 "Everybody's Got To Learn Sometime" (Sue Me Please Mix) / "Everybody's Got To Learn Sometime"  (Berlin Mix) (12", Euro Records EURY 3XX, UK 1993)

References

1992 albums
The Korgis albums